The 1st Louisiana Regiment New Orleans Infantry was a regiment in the Union Army during the American Civil War.

The Regiment was organized in New Orleans, Louisiana, on March 6, 1864, and was on garrison and guard duty in the New Orleans defenses. The unit mustered out in May 1866.

See also

List of Louisiana Union Civil War units

References

New Orleans Infantry, 001
Louisiana New Orleans Infantry, 001
Military units and formations established in 1864
1864 establishments in Louisiana
Military units and formations disestablished in 1866
1866 disestablishments in the United States